Charles Edward Barry KC (30 September 1877 – 11 April 1956) was a South African judge who served as Judge President of the Transvaal Provincial Division of the Supreme Court of South Africa.

Early life and education
Barry was born Sea Point, Cape Town, his father, James Michael Barry, was a Cape attorney and his mother, Johanna Philippina Kuhnhardt, was a celebrated linguist.

Barry received his education in Europe, first in Heidelberg, Germany, and then at St Paul's School, London. After his schooling, he went on to Trinity College, Oxford, where in 1900 he earned his BA in Classics. While at Oxford he also excelled in sports, such as cricket, rowing and he captained the university's first rugby team.

Career
After university he worked in London for a steamship company, studying law part-time. In 1904 he was admitted to the Inner Temple and next year he returned to South Africa and joined the Pretoria Bar. He took silk in December 1922 and in June 1926 received an acting judge appointment at the Transvaal Provincial Division. Barry was appointed puisne judge of the Transvaal Provincial Division of the Supreme Court on the 1st of March 1927, and he became Judge President in 1943. He retired in September 1947.

See also
List of Judges President of the Gauteng Division of the High Court of South Africa

References

1877 births
1956 deaths
South African judges
South African Queen's Counsel
Members of the Inner Temple